The 1924 Cincinnati Bearcats football team was an American football team that represented the University of Cincinnati as a member of the Buckeye Athletic Association during the 1924 college football season. In their third season under head coach George McLaren, the Bearcats compiled a 2–6–1 record (1–4 against conference opponents). Tony McAndrews was the team captain. The team played its home games at Nippert Stadium in Cincinnati. Nippert Stadium was dedicated November 8, 1924.

Schedule

References

Cincinnati
Cincinnati Bearcats football seasons
Cincinnati Bearcats football